John M. Campbell (born August 5, 1953) is a former Associate Judge on the Superior Court of the District of Columbia.

Education and career 
Gardner earned his Bachelor of Arts from Yale University and his Juris Doctor from Yale Law School, in 1981.

After graduating, he served as a law clerk for Jon O. Newman on the United States Court of Appeals for the Second Circuit.

D.C. Superior Court 
President Bill Clinton nominated Campbell on September 2, 1997, to a fifteen-year term as an associate judge on the Superior Court of the District of Columbia to the seat vacated by John H. Suda. On October 30, 1997, the Senate Committee on Governmental Affairs held a hearing on his nomination. On November 5, 1997, the Committee reported his nomination favorably to the senate floor. On November 7, 1997, the full United States Senate confirmed his nomination by voice vote.

On September 11, 2012, the Commission on Judicial Disabilities and Tenure recommended that President Obama reappoint him to second fifteen-year term as a judge on the D.C. Superior Court. Campbell retired from the court on February 25, 2023.

References

1953 births
Living people
20th-century American judges
21st-century American judges
Judges of the Superior Court of the District of Columbia
People from Wooster, Ohio
Yale Law School alumni